Safa Kınalı (born 29 April 1999) is a Turkish professional footballer who plays as a winger for TFF First League club Boluspor on loan from Trabzonspor.

Professional career
Kınalı is a youth product of the academies of Trabzonspor and 1461 Trabzon. On 5 July 2018 he signed his first professional contract with Trabzonspor and shortly went on loan to 1461 Trabzon in the 2018–19 season in the TFF Third League. He returned to Trabzonspor in 2019, and made his professional debut with them in a 0–0 Süper Lig tie with Denizlispor on 19 September 2020.

Kınalı joined Tuzlaspor on loan for the 2021–22 season. He then joined Altınordu on loan for the 2022–23 season in the TFF First League on 4 July 2022. On 27 December 2022 Kınalı moved on a new loan to Boluspor.

Personal life
Kınalı is distantly related to the former footballer Selahattin Kınalı.

Honours
Trabzonspor
Turkish Super Cup (1): 2020

References

External links
 
 

1999 births
Sportspeople from Trabzon
Living people
Turkish footballers
Association football wingers
Trabzonspor footballers
1461 Trabzon footballers
Tuzlaspor players
Altınordu F.K. players
Boluspor footballers
Süper Lig players
TFF First League players
TFF Third League players